Brothers Grym (also known as  Ghetto Repaired Young Minds, or The Bee-Geez) was a New York hip-hop group formed by Too Poetic (born Anthony Berkeley on November 15, 1964 – died July 15, 2001) and his two younger brothers, lyricists Brainstorm (born Joel Berkeley in 1969) and R&B hip-hop producer E# (born Edward Berkeley in 1971, aka E Sharp, Goalfingaz).

Biography

Early years 
The first incarnation of the group was formed around 1989 in Amityville, Long Island, New York, although the family grew up in Wyandanch, Long Island. The family of four brothers (Anthony, Richard, Joel, and Edward) and one sister (Dawne), of which Poetic (Anthony) was the eldest, were born to Trinidadian parents who moved from Trinidad and Tobago in 1971, making their first residence in Queens, New York for a short time, then moving to Wyandanch. John Berkeley (a pastor and a local businessman) and Ela Berkeley (a homemaker, cook-nutritionist, and teacher) were both singers and artistic in general, and they encouraged artistic expression in their five children. The family was well-rounded musically, singing gospel and R&B up to their early teens all around New York, other states, and Canada as "The Berkeley Singers". Anthony (Poetic), Dawne, and Joel (Brainstorm) sang, accompanied by Richard on the drums and Eddie (E-Sharp) on the piano or keyboard.

Poetic began rhyming in his early teens in Wyandanch, and was known by many names, the first of which was MC Supa Flea of the Wyandanch Crew The Phantom Squad, rolling with many other local crews of the era and building a name for himself as a lyrical battle MC.  He changed his name to Poetic around 1985, and in 1986 he formed the crew known as Too Poetic, who in 1988–89 released a modestly popular single called: "God Made Me Funky/Poetical Terror", under the DNA/Tommy Boy Music imprint. The group was composed of his two DJs and childhood friends – DJ Capital K (Fred Cox) and DJ Woody Wood (Randy Woods) – Too Poetic alluded to "Two DJs and One Poet". The radio personality called DNA had been his manager and the host of the Hank Love & DNA Radio Show on 105.9FM WNWK of hip-hop underground radio fame. The group's relationship with Tommy Boy Records eventually panned out for various reasons, scrapping the album and making Poetic very displeased, an early casualty of the politics of the music business. Many artists who are not marketed properly have this attitude with their former labels.

While Poetic was just beginning his formal hip hop career in 1987–89, Brainstorm was attending college at the State University of New York at Farmingdale, Long Island, where he was the roommate of Brooklyn's own Super DJ Richie Rich (who had been in Third Base, Clark Kent's Supermen, and  the movie Juice). The college-based MC-DJ party collective called The Group Home Posse was loosely formed with Brainstorm and DJ Richie Rich to include his childhood friend The DJ-Rapper J.A.T. (Thomas Allen James), DJ Nike, Diamond Jay AKA "Americas Favorite DJ" (EPMD, Gravediggaz, Beyoncé Knowles), and Diamond Shell (Biz Markie's brother) – all of whom attended Farmingdale University between 1987 and 1989. The university was host to many hip hop artists as visitors for parties and to do shows like Rakim, EPMD, Producer-Super DJ Clark Kent, and Biz Markie.

After Brainstorm finished his college run in 1989, he took time to learn many aspects of the music business and attempted to record a solo demo with Marcy Projects' Rapper-Producer The JAZ (Big Jaz, mentor of Jay-Z), and was found in many rap circles with Long Island's KMD and other "conscious" MCs of the time, but in 1989 he and Poetic mutually decided to pair up with a hardcore lyrical edge, original word play, and acute metaphors, after many collaborations between them since 1985. Thus, Da Bruthas G.R.Y.M. was born shortly after Too Poetic's deal with DNA/Tommy Boy had soured. The energy and high chemistry between these true by-blood brothers at the time was, simply put, natural.

The 1989–92 years 

In the first Bruthas G.R.Y.M. era (c. 1989–1992), the brothers Poetic (Brother One) and Brainstorm (Brother Two) garnered much respect on the underground hip hop scene of New York – whose "dubs" from underground radio shows were boasting lyrics beyond what was known at the time. Their first official demo featured the underground bangers "Bruthas G.R.Y.M.", "Circle-Circle-Dot-Dot", the politically charged "Popcorn" and "Livin' In Hell (Had To Survive)", the name-calling "Turtle Soup", and a neighborhood favorite, the battle rhymes of "GRYMnastics". The demo featured production mastering by Nate "NATO" Tinsley, their in-house producer Semi-Automatic (Pedro Sims, Mr. Semi, Gravediggaz), and the brothers themselves. After blazing underground radio and live shows around New York City with their lyrics and knowledge of self-based content, they were listed in The Source magazine as the best unsigned rap group of 1989. The crew was then managed by longtime friend Jack Pope (Jack Sprat, Starving Artists Entertainment), who later became the road manager of the Gravediggaz. They acquired many long-term relationships from Poetic's various musical ties, as well as with Amityville locals like DJ-Cut Monitor Milo of Leaders of the New School ("The Case of the PTA"), Posdonous of De La Soul, and Doo Doo Man Records' Crew (Prince Paul's Def Jam Imprint) Resident Aliens.

These cassette tape "dubs" floated around the New York streets in the late 1980s and early 1990s, and their demo eventually made their way to the seasoned musical ear of fellow Amityvillain Prince Paul (Stetsasonic, De La Soul, Gravediggaz) from his association with the local Long Island artists who had met the brothers and saw their raw talent. He was hooked on the brother's metaphoric flare—all living in Amityville, Long Island, at the time. In 1990 Prince Paul decided to fund and executive produce further demos, finding various other known and up-and-coming producers for the unnamed project, as well as being the tentative DJ for the group, after which they were very close to closing a deal reaching seven figures within a year's time, with bidding by well-known record companies propositioning for their lyrical artistry.

Then the unfortunate happened – being disenfranchised by the politics and games of the music business and life in general, Brainstorm just quit altogether for "personal enlightenment", before any formal deal could solidify. According to him, "it was not about the money, it was about my personal growth and spiritual maturity". Poetic understood about Brainstorm's personal path at that stage in his life, but was silently devastated because they were so close to sealing a major record deal that would have propelled them further into Hip Hop history. Prince Paul was even more puzzled, not fully realizing the reasoning of Brainstorm's sudden move – but he was still optimistic that a future project would be possible. Their original demo, even today, is still one of Prince Paul's favorites. It was not until 1992 that Poetic, after Brainstorm quit pursuing a Hip Hop Career in 1991, that it is said that Poetic "fell on hard times", including a short period of homelessness. Brainstorm would continue to write for leisure and therapeutic reasoning, but never to seriously pursue a music career, moving to Brooklyn New York and later down south to various states; in fact, Brainstorm was so "finished with Hip Hop" that he gave Poetic all of his original rhyme books to use at his own discretion – some lyrics ending up on Gravediggaz projects.

Work with the Gravediggaz 

Poetic, under the guidance of Prince Paul, later transformed into the distinguished G.R.Y.M. or Grym Reaper in the most well-known Horrorcore Super Group Gravediggaz. Prince Paul ("The Undertaker"), The RZA (Prince Rakeem, Wu Tang Clan's Abbot, "The RZArecta"), Frukwan (Stetsasonic, "The Gatekeeper", Sunstar) along with Poetic ("The G.R.Y.M. Reaper", Tony Titanium), all X-Tommy Boy Artists, recorded their demo between 1992–93 and got their deal with Gee Street/Island Records in 1994 – releasing their first classic single "Diary of a Mad Man" featuring Killah Priest and Shabazz the Disciple of the rap group Sunz of Man (Wu Tang Camp). Their first single, which made them an instant fixture on the rap scene, was said to be a parody of the group's trial for the murder of "Tommy's Boy", a broader symbolism for all the record labels who rejected them, or counted their early careers as dead.

Brainstorm was still present for many of the recordings and mastering of the album Six Feet Deep at Fire House Studios, although he had moved out of Brooklyn down to New Orleans, Louisiana and Columbus, Georgia in 1992, then to Birmingham, Alabama 1994. They were still recording songs here and there as Bruthas Grym and as you can well note, Poetic left the original form of the name-acronym G.R.Y.M. to mean "Ghetto Repaired Young Mind" to refer back to Da Bruthas G.R.Y.M. – so it is clear that the seed of his unorthodox style started with the original Bruthas Grym recordings. Poetic, still optimistic despite the turn of events, waited patiently to reunite with Brainstorm to spark the old-school Golden-Age of Hip Hop Flavor that made him hone his original following. Almost viewing the Gravediggaz group-project as a vehicle to do just that. Bruthas Grym was no so-called "horrorcore" group, they were graphic story-tellers as there moniker suggests, and their purpose was always cultural awareness.

The Gravediggaz' album Six Feet Deep (also known as Niggamortis),was Certified Gold and received rave reviews for their original and much misunderstood "horrorcore" angle, spawning countless groups and admirers of the genre in the mid to late 90s. some of which will still acknowledge the impact of the Gravediggaz first album. Gravediggaz did not originate the term "horrorcore"; however, they did become one of the most successful of the genre. Some well known early horrorcore groups were: Russell Simmons' nephew Redrum's (Jamel Simmons) group The Flatlinerz, also featuring Omen [OMN 999], a later inductee into Gravediggaz camp, under Poetic's Sharpshooters Regime on his label Plasma Records.

Reformation of The Bruthas Grym 

The second incarnation of Bruthas Grym was after the first Gravediggaz album when Poetic reached out again to Brainstorm to get back into music through his Sharpshooters Regime and his label Plasma Records in 1996 where he recorded the hard-edged song "Bayaa!" produced by Poetic, and other notable jams with various MCs in the Sharpshooters Regime and Ancient Entities. Brainstorm had been living between Alabama and Georgia at the time, forming a short-lived group of three MCs called Ptahetic Poets (pronounced "path-etic") with two MCs: Mind Bender AKA Reign Supreme and Sound Wave. The Sharpshooters' compilation was being created by a whole regime of artist-soldiers for the project, Poetic was dubbed "General G.R.Y.M." and the self-titled "The Horrorcore Father". Among them were their brother E-Sharp (Eddie "Goalfingaz"), Flatlinerz-Gravediggaz Omen (now known as OMN 999), Sun of Man's Shabazz the Disciple, Shaqueen (Ma Barker), Amaze, Malik, Smuggler, Rhyme Valor, singer-songwriter Bell Muhammad, and others. Brainstorm and their cousin Prince (Self X-Planatory) crafted all of the skits of the groundbreaking album that was consequently never released. It was then that Poetic and Brainstorm recorded a few songs under the Bruthas G.R.Y.M. name again—most notably, "Buildin; In The Buildin'" produced by their brother E-Sharp.

The youngest of the brothers, known as E-Sharp then, although not a part of the original Brothers G.R.Y.M. crew, had been working closely alongside Poetic on the first Gravediggaz LP and more closely on their second LP "The Pick, The Sickle, And The Shovel", as well as the Sharpshooters-Plasma Records compilation along with another cousin and sound engineer Big Winst. E-Sharp and Big Winst (Gravediggaz) had both attended Five Towns College together to pursue careers as audio engineering and production. After graduation, E-Sharp quickly became a Top-Ten R&B Producer under the name "Goalfingaz" with Kay Gee's (Naughty By Nature) Divine Mills Label, gaining production credits and crafting such notable R&B hits like: the Divine Mills' group Next's "Wifey", Divine Mills' crooner Jaheim's "Just In Case" and "Fabulous", Ideal's "Whatever", Faith Evans' "Good Life", the late Gerald Lavert's "Made To Love You", and various other gold and platinum hits, working with many Hip Hop and R&B groups and soloists since the mid 90s. He is currently working with Reign Supreme, American Idol's Brittenum Twins, and 112's Slim and Q. By far, he is the most musical of the brothers.

Death of Poetic and hopeful reactivation of the project 
Death: In April 1999: "Grym Reaper" was diagnosed with a deadly colon cancer, and was given only three months to live. On Sunday, July 15, 2001, Anthony "Grym Reaper" Berkeley died, almost two years longer than the time he was given by the doctors.

See also 

Too Poetic

References 

American hip hop groups
Horrorcore groups
Rappers from New York (state)
Musical groups established in 1989
People from Amityville, New York
People from Wyandanch, New York